

Year-by-Year

Performance Record
Includes playoff games

2009 season

Scores are posted as STL-opponentA note on home games: Game 1 was played at Ralph Korte Stadium at SIUE, game 3 was played at Robert R. Hermann Stadium at SLU, game 5 was back at Korte Stadium, and the remaining home games take place at Anheuser-Busch Soccer Park.

Playoffs

2010 season

Scores are posted as STL-opponent

See also
Saint Louis Athletica

Seasons
 
Saint Louis Athletica
Women's football club seasons
Saint Louis Athletica seasons